Anna Van Meter is an American clinical psychologist. She is on the faculty of New York University Grossman School of Medicine in the Department of Child and Adolescent Psychiatry. She leads the Investigating Mood Pathology: Assessment, Course, Treatment (IMPACT) Lab. Van Meter and her team conduct research on mood disorders and associated clinical phenomena, including suicide. They focus on innovative, technology-based approaches to improve the rapid identification of symptoms in youth and to facilitate access to evidence-based care.

Education and degrees

Anna Van Meter, Ph.D. graduated cum laude from Dartmouth College. She majored in Psychology and minored in Women's Studies. She earned her Master of Arts in clinical psychology and her doctorate in clinical psychology with an emphasis in quantitative psychology from the University of North Carolina at Chapel Hill. She completed her clinical internship at the University of Illinois at Chicago.

Positions and roles

Van Meter is currently on the faculty of NYU Grossman School of Medicine in the Department of Child and Adolescent Psychiatry. She was on the faculty of Yeshiva University in the Ferkauf Graduate School of Psychology from 2013 to 2017. In 2018, she joined the faculty at the Feinstein Institutes for Medical Research of Northwell Health and Donald and Barbara Zucker School of Medicine at Hofstra/Northwell. Although she joined NYU in 2022, she remains affiliated with Northwell Health and the Zucker School of Medicine.

Research 
Van Meter has authored over 60 peer-reviewed publications and has given more than 50 national and international talks on topics including bipolar spectrum disorders, evidence-based assessment, and digital psychiatry. She is an author on more than 100 conference abstracts. Her most cited work is a 2011 meta-analysis of the prevalence of bipolar disorder in youth (updated in 2019), which helped to establish that bipolar disorder affects youth and that its prevalence has been consistent over time around the world. She is also the lead author on a meta-analysis of the symptoms of the prodrome to bipolar disorder, which provided a foundation for work by her and others aiming to predict the risk of onset of bipolar disorder. Van Meter is the recipient of a K23 career development award from the National Institute of Mental Health to study the digital phenotype of bipolar disorder in youth. The aims of this study include determining whether data collected from adolescents' smartphone sensors can help to predict relapse in those with bipolar disorder and identifying differences in the digital phenotypes of typically developing adolescents and those with bipolar disorder.

Van Meter also has several publications related to suicide, including an international meta-analysis of the prevalence of suicidal thoughts and behaviors in youth, and a paper describing how Google search data may have potential as a way by which to identify suicide risk. She has a NARSAD Young Investigator Award from the Brain and Behavior Research Foundation to study the digital phenotype of proximal risk for suicide in youth. This study aims to evaluate whether keyboard metadata, along with other smartphone sensor data, can help identify youth at imminent risk for suicidal behaviors.

Van Meter is interested in how technology can help facilitate access to evidence-based care for youth, especially those in under-served communities. She has led multiple RCTs of technology-based interventions. She demonstrated preliminary efficacy for computer-based interpretation bias training as a way by which to improve social functioning and mood in young people with bipolar disorder. Additionally, she recently completed a trial of an online peer support community for adolescents to test the feasibility and safety of such a community. She also conducted a study using blue-light blocking glasses to improve sleep quality and mental health outcomes among college students.

Van Meter has published multiple papers on the process of evidence-based assessment and on the diagnostic efficiency of commonly used assessment tools. These papers guide readers through the process of evidence-based assessment and are intended to facilitate early identification and appropriate treatment for youth with mental health problems. She is active in Helping Give Away Psychological Science (HGAPS), a 501(c)3, focused on disseminating information to promote well-being in the community. Much of her work with HGAPS has involved updating Wikipedia pages for symptom measures to make these tools easily accessible.

Service 
Van Meter serves as the President of HGAPS, a non-profit service organization. She is also on the Council for the American Psychopathological Association. Van Meter conducts pro bono psychological evaluations for people seeking asylum through the Weill Cornell Center for Human Rights. She previously served as Secretary on the board of directors for the Society for Clinical Child and Adolescent Psychology and as co-president for the Bipolar Disorders Special Interest Group of the Association for Behavioral and Cognitive Therapies.

Clinical work 
Van Meter is trained in cognitive behavior therapy and dialectical behavioral therapy. In her clinical work, she specializes in evidence-based assessment and diagnosis and in the treatment of mood and anxiety disorders. She sees patients through the Faculty Group Practice at New York University Langone Health.

Honors and awards
Van Meter is the recipient of numerous honors and awards, including the following.

Selected publications 
Below are Van Meter's most cited publications out of more than 80 papers and chapters.

References

External links
 Personal Website
 
 PubMed Profile
 NYU Profile Page
 NYU Faculty Bibliography

21st-century American psychologists
Living people
University of North Carolina at Chapel Hill alumni
Dartmouth College alumni
New York University Grossman School of Medicine faculty
Yeshiva University faculty
Northwell Health
Hofstra University faculty
Mental health researchers
American women psychologists
Year of birth missing (living people)